Heterodera tabacum is (synonym of Globodera tabacum) a plant pathogenic nematode affecting Jerusalem cherries (Solanum pseudocapsicum).

See also 
 List of Jerusalem cherry diseases

References 

tabacum
Plant pathogenic nematodes